Jennifer Mary Leak (born September 28, 1947) is a Canadian film and television actress, best known for her role as Colleen North in the 1968 film Yours, Mine and Ours.

Career 
Leak played the role of Olive Springer Gordon Randolph in the soap opera Another World (1976–1979), and Blanche Bouvier in Guiding Light (1981–82). In addition, Leak created the role of Gwen Sherman, who started out as a prostitute who fell in love with Greg Foster and ended up becoming a nun in the mid-1970s on the CBS soap The Young and the Restless.

She also played guest spots on various TV shows, including McMillan and Wife and Hawaii Five-O. In 1973, she played Erica Jordan, Mary's temporary replacement at WJM-TV, in the season four episode "Better Late...That's a Pun...Than Never" in The Mary Tyler Moore Show.

Personal life
Leak was married to Tim Matheson from 1968 to 1971.

Filmography

Film

Television

References

External links

Canadian film actresses
Canadian soap opera actresses
Canadian television actresses
Actresses from Montreal
1950 births
Living people